Chipley may refer to:
Chipley, Florida,  a city in Washington County, Florida, United States
Chipley, Georgia or Pine Mountain, Harris County, Georgia
Chipley, Somerset, a United Kingdom location
Chipley Priory, a medieval Augustine priory near Clare, Suffolk, United Kingdom

People with the surname
Bill Chipley, American football player
William Dudley Chipley, American railroad tycoon and statesman